Robert P. Tiller (born December 11, 1949 in Amsterdam, The Netherlands) is a Canadian Thoroughbred racehorse trainer. A resident of Brampton, Ontario, he has long been one of the top trainers at Toronto's Woodbine Racetrack. He has won four training titles at Woodbine Racetrack, earned three Sovereign Awards for Outstanding Trainer and was inducted into the Canadian Horse Racing Hall of Fame in 2008.

Tiller began training in 1972 and won his first race with Royal Greek Ship. He had his first starter in the Queen's Plate in 1975, finishing second with longshot Near the High Sea. Some of his early stars include stakes winners Domasca Dan, Elated Guy and Talk Back.

Tiller has won four Woodbine training titles, capturing top honours in 1994 with 65 wins, 1997 (55 wins), 2001 (62 wins), and 2003 (72 wins). He was originally known as a trainer of claiming horses, but now trains mainly stakes and allowance horses. Tiller earned his first Sovereign Award for Outstanding Trainer in 2001. The year was highlighted by six stakes victories by trainee Win City, who was voted Canadian Horse of the Year. Win City finished second in the Queen's Plate but came back to win the Prince of Wales Stakes, earning Tiller his first victory in a Canadian Triple Crown race. That year, Tiller also trained Rare Friends, the Canadian Champion Two-Year-Old Colt.

In 2003, Tiller earned his second Sovereign Award after a career-best year with 71 wins including 15 stakes victories and earnings of over Can$4 million. Trainee Brass in Pocket was a Sovereign-Award finalist after winning five stakes races.

Tiller followed up with his third Sovereign Award in 2004, a year where he was Woodbine's leading sprint trainer with 47 wins in the division. Trainee Simply Lovely was named the Canadian Champion Two-Year-Old Filly.

In 2008, he was inducted in the Canadian Horse Racing Hall of Fame.

On June 19, 2020, at Woodbine Racetrack, Tiller won his 2000th race.

Tiller has been one of Woodbine's leading trainers, especially in the sprint division. He came back into the spotlight in 2017 when trainee Pink Lloyd earned eight straight stakes victories on his way to Canadian Horse of the Year and Champion Sprinter honours. He had to work around Pink Lloyd's early injury problems and adopted an unusual training schedule to keep the horse relaxed in the mornings.

References

 Jockey Club of Canada

1949 births
Living people
Canadian horse trainers
Sovereign Award winners
Canadian Horse Racing Hall of Fame inductees
People from Brampton
Dutch emigrants to the United States